Cissy Houston is the second studio album by American soul/gospel singer Cissy Houston, released in 1977 on Private Stock Records as the follow-up to her debut album, Presenting Cissy Houston. The original recording was re-mastered and includes extensive liner notes and re-released on CD under Cherry Red Records in 2013.

The album was produced and arranged by Michael Zager and features  pop/soul cover versions of Elton John's "Your Song", "Make It Easy on Yourself", written by Burt Bacharach and Hal David, as well as covers of "He Ain't Heavy, He's My Brother" and "Tomorrow" from the musical Annie.

Track listing
U.S., UK Vinyl, LP Album

Personnel
Backing Vocals – Cissy Houston, Alvin Fields, Arnold McCuller, David Lasley, Ken Williams, Maeretha Stewart, Ullanda McCullough
Bass – Bob Babbitt, Will Lee
Drums – Rick Marotta, Steve Jordan
English Horn – George Marge
Executive producer – Jerry Love
French Horn – Brooks Tillotson, Jim Buffington, Sharon Moe
Guitar – Cornell Dupree, Jeff Mironov, Lance Quinn
Keyboards – Donny Harper, Leon Pendarvis, Richard Tee, Rob Mounsey
Mixed By – Bob Walker, Lee Yates, Phil Gianbalvo
Alto Saxophone, Tenor Saxophone, Alto Flute, Oboe, English Horn – George Marge (tracks: B1)
Percussion – Rubens Bassini
Alto Saxophone, Tenor Saxophone, Alto Flute – Arnie Lawrence (tracks: B3)
Strings – Alfred Vincent Brown Strings
Trombone – David Taylor, Gerald Chamberlain
Trumpet, Flugelhorn – John Gatchell, Robert Millikan
Engineer – Tim Geelan
Photography, Design - Ed Caraeff

References

External links
Cissy Houston
Cissy Houston CD Album

1977 albums
Cissy Houston albums
Private Stock Records albums